Sayyidate may refer to:

 Khayat al-Sayyidate, a film by Duraid Lahham
 Sayyidat, a female equivalent of sayyid

See also
 Sayyid (name)